Textile fibres or textile fibers (see spelling differences) can be created from many natural sources (animal hair or fur, cocoons as with silk worm cocoons), as well as semisynthetic methods that use naturally occurring polymers, and synthetic methods that use polymer-based materials, and even minerals such as metals to make foils and wires. The consumer protection laws requires that fibre content be provided on content labels.  Common textile fibres used in global fashion today include:

Animal-based fibres

Plant-based fibres (cellulosic fibres)
 

Other plant-based fibers:

 Bast fibre
 Cedar bark textile
 Esparto
 Fique
 Papyrus
 Straw

Mineral-based fibres
 

 Basalt fiber
 Copper
 Gold
 Steel

Synthetic fibres

See also

 Fibre
 Textile
 Textile manufacturing
 Textile manufacturing terminology
 Timeline of clothing and textiles technology
 Units of textile measurement

References 

Textiles
Clothing industry